William W. Axe School is a historic school building located in the Frankford neighborhood of Philadelphia, Pennsylvania. It was designed by Lloyd Titus and built in 1903–1904. It is a two-story, three-bay, stone building on a raised basement in the Colonial Revival style. It has a one-story, rear brick addition. It features stone lintels and sashes and a projecting center section with gable.

It was added to the National Register of Historic Places in 1988. It is currently home to the Northeast Frankford site of the Boys & Girls Clubs of Philadelphia.

References

School buildings on the National Register of Historic Places in Philadelphia
Colonial Revival architecture in Pennsylvania
School buildings completed in 1904
Frankford, Philadelphia
Defunct schools in Pennsylvania
1904 establishments in Pennsylvania